The 2019 UCI Track Cycling World Championships were held in Pruszków, Poland from 27 February to 3 March 2019.

Schedule
20 events were held:

Medal summary

Medals table

Men

Women

Shaded events are non-Olympic

References

External links
Official website

 
UCI Track Cycling World Championships by year
World Championships
2019 in Polish sport
International cycle races hosted by Poland
Pruszków County
UCI Track Cycling World Championships
UCI Track Cycling World Championships